Phangkhar Gewog (Dzongkha: ཕང་མཁར་) is a gewog (village block) of Zhemgang District, Bhutan. Phangkhar Gewog is also a part of Panbang Dungkhag (sub-district), along with Goshing, Ngangla, and Bjoka Gewogs.

References

Gewogs of Bhutan
Zhemgang District